Eiche can refer to:

Places 

 Eiche (Potsdam), a locality (Ortsteil) of Potsdam, Germany
 Eiche (Barnim), a locality (Ortsteil) of Ahrensfelde, Germany
 Eiche or Eichbach (Hahle), a short river in Eichsfeld district, Germany

Historical events 

 Operation Eiche, also known as the Gran Sasso raid in World War II

See also
 Eich (disambiguation)